The Ferrovia Circumetnea (roughly translated as "Round-Etna Railway") is a narrow-gauge, regional railway line in Sicily. It was constructed between 1895 and 1898.

As the name suggests, the  line follows a route which almost completely encircles the Mount Etna volcano.

The original terminal was at Catania Porto, although Catania Central (the mainline station) was the last stop for the trains. However, in the 1990s the section from there to Catania Borgo ( long) was converted to
standard gauge and moved underground for most of its length for use as a new metro (Metropolitana di Catania).  The original terminus, the Porto station, was also reinstated. Therefore, the Circumetnea trains now terminate at Catania Borgo.

The Ferrovia Circumetnea (FCE) also operates the Metropolitana. The offices for both are at Catania Borgo.

FCE operates The DMU 001-004, multiple units diesel of construction Newag. They were in service with four more on order as of late 2017.

Gallery

References

External links

Official Website (mostly in Italian; English, French and non-flash versions undermaintained)
High quality photos of FCE rolling stock
Circumetnea picture gallery on TrainsPictures.com

Circumetnea
950 mm gauge railways in Italy